Silvio Peter "Tino" Insana (February 15, 1948 – May 31, 2017) was an American actor, producer, writer, and comedian.

Life and career
Insana was born in Chicago, Illinois on February 15, 1948, the son of Silvio A. Insana, a musician, and Hiloray (Swanson). In 1971, Insana co-founded a local comedy troupe known as the West Compass Trio, along with Steve Beshekas and John Belushi. The group performed regularly in universities around the midwest until Belushi and Insana were hired by The Second City in Chicago. Insana left Second City in 1975 to form his own comedy troupe with fellow alums Jim Staahl and Jim Fisher, The Graduates. The trio made numerous appearances on television and campuses, as well as in clubs and at corporate presentations across the country. In 1977 Insana made his film debut in Rowby Goren and Chick Staley's comedy Crackin' Up. In the 1980s, Insana wrote two episodes for Police Squad! and an episode of Sledge Hammer!; he also served as story editor on both series. Insana then wrote, produced, and acted in Wedding Band and Masters of Menace.

Insana also made brief acting appearances in such films as Neighbors, Three Amigos, Who's Harry Crumb?, The Couch Trip, Oscar, and Beverly Hills Cop III. He also made guest appearances on situation comedy series such as Night Court and Mad About You.

Insana's voice has been featured in many animated television series, most notably Disney's Darkwing Duck as Dr. Reginald Bushroot and Bobby's World as Bobby's Uncle Ted. He also voiced Pig in Nickelodeon's animated film Barnyard and its subsequent spin-off TV series.
In 2008, Insana voiced the role of Barf on Spaceballs: The Animated Series, inheriting the role from John Candy. He also did voice work in Goof Troop, Camp Candy, The Little Mermaid, Pepper Ann (as Pepper Ann's police officer uncle Jojo), House of Mouse, What-a-Mess, Bonkers, Aladdin, Jungle Cubs, Problem Child, Buzz Lightyear of Star Command, Teacher's Pet, and Tom and Jerry: The Movie.

He was the speaking voice of Mr. Grouper in Bubble Guppies.

Death
On May 31, 2017, Insana died of cancer at the age of 69 at Cedars-Sinai Medical Center in Los Angeles, California.

Filmography

References

External links
 

1948 births
2017 deaths
American male film actors
Film producers from Illinois
American male screenwriters
American male television actors
American television writers
American male video game actors
American male voice actors
American writers of Italian descent
American male television writers
Male actors from Chicago
Screenwriters from Illinois